The Hiding of Black Bill was a 1918 American silent short film directed by David Smith, distributed by General Film Company. It is based on a story by O. Henry.

Cast
Walter Rogers as W.L. Rogers - a hobo
Chet Ryan - Henry Ogden

References

External links
 

American black-and-white films
American silent feature films
1918 films
Lost American films
1910s American films